Clifford V. Smith Jr. (born 1931) is the 4th chancellor of University of Wisconsin–Milwaukee and the first African American four-year college chancellor in the University of Wisconsin System.

Before joining UW-Milwaukee, Smith had been on academic positions with City University of New York, Tufts University, the University of Massachusetts Amherst, the University of Connecticut and Oregon State University. He became the president of GE Foundation after his tenure.

Smith obtained his B.S. from University of Iowa, M.S. and Ph.D. from Johns Hopkins University.

References

Chancellors of the University of Wisconsin-Milwaukee
University of Iowa alumni
Johns Hopkins University alumni
1931 births
Living people